Muhammed Said Abdulla or Abdullah (25 April 1918 – March 1991), was a Tanzanian Swahili novelist who is often credited as a pioneer of Swahili popular literature.

Life
Muhammed Said Abdulla was born in Makunduchi, Zanzibar to a Muslim family. He received his secondary education at a missionary school, and after graduating in 1938, began working for the state Civil Health Department as an inspector. While there he served as editor for the Department of Agriculture's Swahili Bulletin. Abdulla went into journalism and in 1948, he became editor of the newspaper Zanzibari. He later became assistant editor of Al-Falaq, Afrika Kwetu, and Al Mahda. From 1958 to his retirement in 1968 he served as editor of the agricultural magazine Mkulima.

In 1958 fiction work Mzimu wa Watu wa Kale (Shrine of the Ancestors) won top honors at the Swahili Story-Writing Competition held by the East African Literature Bureau; in 1960 the work was published as a novel. The novel was noted for breaking away from folktale traditions that were popular in Swahili literature at the time. Mzimu wa Watu wa Kale marked the first appearance of Bwana Msa, a detective character that features in most of his subsequent works. The plots of Abdulla's later novels became progressively more and more complex and sophisticated. These plots usually involved a protagonist who must battle ignorance and superstition in order to resolve the conflict.

Works
 Shrine of the Ancestors (Mzimu wa Watu wa Kale), 1960
 The Well of Giningi (Kisima cha Giningi), 1968
 In the World There Are People (Duniani Kuna Watu), 1973
 The Secret of the Zero (Siri ya Sifuri), 1974
 One Wife, Three Husbands (Mke Mmoja Waume Watatu), 1975
 The Devil's Child is Taken Care of (Mwana wa Yungi Hulewa), 1976
 Bwana Msa's Mistake (Kosa la Bwana Msa), 1984

Awards
 Swahili Story-writing Contest (1957-8) Mzimu wa Watu wa Kale

References

1918 births
1991 deaths
Zanzibari people
Tanzanian novelists
Swahili-language writers
20th-century novelists